Bossiaea eriocarpa, commonly known as common brown pea, is a species of flowering plant in the family Fabaceae and is endemic to the south-west of Western Australia. It is a shrub with narrow oblong or linear leaves and yellow and red flowers.

Description
The leaves are glabrous, the lower surface paler than the upper surface.

Taxonomy and naming
Bossiaea eriocarpa was first formally described in 1837 by George Bentham in Enumeratio plantarum quas in Novae Hollandiae ora austro-occidentali ad fluvium Cygnorum et in sinu Regis Georgii collegit Carolus Liber Baro de Hügel from specimens collected near King George Sound. The specific epithet (eriocarpa) means "wool-fruited".

Distribution and habitat
Common brown pea grows in a range of habitats in near-coastal areas from Zuytdorp Nature Reserve north of Kalbarri to near Albany in the Avon Wheatbelt, Esperance Plains, Geraldton Sandplains, Jarrah Forest and Swan Coastal Plain biogeographic regions of south-western Western Australia.

Conservation status
Bossiaea eriocarpa is classified as "not threatened" by the Government of Western Australia Department of Parks and Wildlife.

References

eriocarpa
Flora of Western Australia
Plants described in 1837
Taxa named by George Bentham